Vladimir Borsoev was the commander of the 7th Guards anti-tank artillery brigade in the Second World War for which he was posthumously awarded the title Hero of the Soviet Union.

Early life 
Borsoev was born April 13, 1906, in Holbot, Irkutsk in the Russian Empire. He was an ethnic Buryat.

In 1932 he entered the Leningrad Artillery School and in 1941 he graduated from M.V. Frunze Military Academy.

World War II 
Borsoev was sent to the Eastern Front of World War II in June 1941. He participated in the Battle of Kursk and offensive campaigns in Ukraine and Poland. On March 8, 1945, Guard Colonel Vladimir Borsoev in battles on the Oder bridgehead was seriously wounded and died of his wounds. He was buried in Lviv, Ukraine.

On 6 May 1965 Guard Colonel Vladimir Borsoev was posthumously awarded the title Hero of the Soviet Union "for courage and heroism in the battles against the Nazi invaders" by Decree of the Presidium of the Supreme Soviet.

Honours and awards
Hero of the Soviet Union (1965)
Order of Lenin (1944)
Order of Lenin (1965)
Order of the Patriotic War (1945)
Order of the Red Star (1941)

Memory
One of the streets in the city of Ulan-Ude is named in his honor.

References

People from Buryatia
Soviet military personnel killed in World War II
People from Irkutsk Oblast
Buryat people
1906 births
1945 deaths
Recipients of the Order of the Red Banner
Heroes of the Soviet Union